Pilvi Takala (born 1981, Helsinki) is a performance artist presenting candid camera as art. Takala won the Dutch Prix de Rome in 2011 and the Emdash Award in 2013. Her works have been exhibited in various exhibitions worldwide, most recently in London, Aarhus and Glasgow. She is known best for being in time-based media.

Takala lives in Helsinki and Berlin.

Personal life and education 
Pilvi Takala was born and grew up in Helsinki. She was educated at the Institute of Fine Arts from 2000–2001, had Bachelor in Fine Art (2005) and Master of Fine Arts (2006) from the Academy of Fine Arts, Helsinki. In 2004 she spent six months at Glasgow School of Art on an exchange programme. 

In the recent years Takala is moving from country to country, having lived and performed in Scotland, the Netherlands and Turkey.

Career 
Takala's initial work focuses on interventions in everyday life. She treats her body as an artistic material, using it in different predicaments. By doing this she shows that her feelings are evolving in the course of an intervention to reveal the different expectations of society.

Style 
Takala mixes in her work the reality of documented actions with staged portraiture. Her works clearly show that it is often possible to learn of the implicit rules of a social situation only by its disruption. In her video works based on performative interventions, Takala researches specific communities to explore social structures and questions the normative rules of behavior in different contexts. Her works explore conduct enforced but not necessarily written down or discussed – social unspoken rules that are exposed only when someone like Takala runs counter them.

Performances 
For her early slide show installation and artist's book Bag Lady (2006) she wandered for a week in a Berlin shopping mall with a lot of cash in a transparent plastic bag to observe the reaction of the people around: suspicion from security guards and disdain from shopkeepers.

In her another work, an installation and video project The Trainee (2008), Takala secretly filmed herself sitting motionless and doing nothing or riding the whole day long in the elevator during her internship in the marketing department at accountancy firm Deloitte. The artwork aimed to shake up everyday life in the office and show other employees’ reactions to Takala's unconventional working methods. Her actions made other coworkers uneasy and resulted in them report HR manager about her behavior.

In Real Snow White (2009) Takala dressed herself as Snow White and attempted to buy a ticket to enter Euro Disney. The video reveals the inability of Euro Disney employees to adequately explain why she can't enter like any other visitor who wants to visit the theme park.

In 2013 Takala won Frieze Foundation Embash Award and established a committee of children aged from 8 to 12 to decide how to spend £7,000 out of £10,000 awarded to her. During the project called The committee she observed kids’ decision making methods through a series of workshops. As a result, the Committee made a decision to create ‘a five-star bouncy castle’. Takala calls her giving money to these kids and the knowledge that children have control and reactions this causes in the world ‘a performative action’.

In her recent video installation The Stroker (2018) filmed at Second Home, a co-working space in London, Takala moves through the building and greets the members of Second Home gently touching them on the arm or shoulder. These gestures of care and attention subvert established rules of office conduct, provoking some strong reactions such as visible discomfort, nervousness and tension that are reenacted through facial expressions, bodily movements, silence or awkward verbal exchanges. 

By touching people Takala probes at the complexities of personal boundaries and individual attitudes toward touch, particularly in the workplace. Her aim is to challenge some kind of boundary in non-aggressive way.

Reception 
 "Over the past decade, artist Pilvi Takala has developed an intriguing body of work, which dismantles established conventions created within particular, usually closed social environments." – Finnish Cultural Institute in New York   
 "She quotes and stretches the limits of different genres including the one of being a performance artist, a director, and a documentary maker." – International Studio & Curatorial Program  
 "Pilvi Takala is one of the most successful new-generation artists in Finland." – Kiasma Finnish National Gallery  
 "She quotes and stretches the limits of different genres, including documentary making and performance." – Helsinki Contemporary 
 "Takala ... with an asymmetric blonde fringe and the softest of voices, has a certain childishness about her that perhaps lessens the surprise of her commitment to the project." – Vogue

Work

Filmography 

 Amusement Park (2001, short)
 Women in Kahves (2005, instal)
 The Switch (2005, instal)
 Seinäruusu/Wallflower (2006, short)
 Easy Rider (2006, short)
 The Shining Shining (2007, instal)
 Kuuluttaja/The Announcer (2007, short)
 The Angels (2008, short)
 The Messengers (2008, instal)
 Real Snow White (2009, short)
 Players (2010, short)
 Among Others (2001–2010, instal)
 Broad Sense (2012, instal)
 Drive with Care (2014, short) 
 The Stroker (2019, short)

Major exhibitions

Solo exhibitions 
 2021 Sweat Equity, Krieg, Hasselt (online)
 2018  Second Shift, Museum of Contemporary Art Kiasma, Helsinki 
The Stroker, Carlos/Ishikawa, London
 2017   The Committee, Pump House Gallery, London 
 2016    Kunsthal Aarhus, Denmark The Centre for Contemporary Arts, Glasgow, Scotland
 Workers Forum, YAMA, Istanbul
 2015 Invisible Friend, Helsinki Contemporary
 Give a little bit, Collaboration with Amelie Befeldt, Alkovi, Helsinki The Committee, Stacion – Centre for Contemporary Art, Prishtina, Kosovo
 2014 Lawyer Of The Week, Futura Centre For Contemporary Art, Prague, Czech Republic
 Attires and Attitudes, Tartu Art Museum, Estonia
 2013 Slight Chance, Bonniers Konsthall, Stockholm, Sweden; Fabra I Coats, Centre D'Art Contemporani, Barcelona, Spain
 2012 Random Numbers, Carlos/Ishikawa, London, UK
Aside, P74 Gallery, Ljubljana, Slovenia
 Breaching Experiments, Site Gallery, Sheffield, UK
 Disappearing Act, Galerie Diana Stigter, Amsterdam, The Netherlands (featuring Siri Baggerman)
 Suggested Value, Künstlerhaus Bremen, Germany
 Just when I thought I was out...they pull me back in, Kunsthalle Erfurt, Germany Broad Sense, Forum Box / Mediaboxi, Helsinki, Finland
 2011 Sidelines, Sørlandets Kunstmuseum, Kristiansand, Norway
 Flip Side, Kunsthalle Lissabon, Portugal
 2010 You Canʼt Do What You Canʼt Imagine, Finnish-Norwegian Culture Institute, Oslo, Norway
 Fear Cure, Inkijk, SKOR, Amsterdam, The Netherlands
 Real Snow White, Backspace, Galerie Diana Stigter, Amsterdam, The Netherlands
 2009 The Trainee, Studio K, Kiasma Museum of Contemporary Art, Helsinki, Finland 
 Real Snow White, Masa-project, Istanbul, Turkey
 The Trainee, Ellen de Bruijne Projects, Amsterdam, The Netherlands
 Angels and Messengers, Hiap Project Room, Helsinki, Finland
 2008 Outshiners, Galerija Miroslav Kraljevic, Zagreb, Croatia
 The Angels, Turku Art Museum, Finland
 The Trainee, Kiasma Museum of Contemporary Art, Helsinki, Finland
 On Volatility with Elmas Deniz, Galeria Noua, Bucharest, Romania
 Between Sharing and Caring, FaFa-gallery, Helsinki, Finland; Frac des Pays de La Loire, France
 2006 Wallflower, Rael Artel Gallery, Pärnu and Tallinn, Estonia

Public collections 

 Espoo Museum of Modern Art EMMA, Espoo, Finland
Saastamoinen Foundation collection, Finland De Hallen Haarlem, The Netherlands
 Teixera de Freitas’ Collection, Portugal
 Kiasma Museum of Contemporary Art / Finnish National Gallery, Finland
 The State Art Collection, Finland
 Helsinki City Art Museum, Finland
 Helmond Municipal Museum, The Netherlands Amos Anderson Art Museum, Finland
 Henna ja Pertti Niemistö Foundation, Finland

Selected publications 

 2018 Second Shift, Kiasma and Garret Publications, 2018 
2012 Pilvi Takala: Just when I thought I was out...they pull me back in monograph published by Hatje Cantz, Germany 
2008 Younger Than Jesus Artist Directory, Phaidon and The New Museum, New York 2007 
Pilvi Takala: Between Sharing and Caring, exhibition catalogue, Frac des Pays de La Loire Bag Lady, Istanbul
 2005 Event on Garnethill, Helsinki
 2003 Kuvasto, Helsinki

Awards and nominations 

 2013 State Prize for Visual Arts, Finland
 2013 Emdash Award, Frieze London 
 2013 Akseli Gallen-Kallela Award, Kalevala Society, FI
 2011 Prix de Rome Visual Arts 1st Prize, The Netherlands
 2011 Stuttgart Film Winter, Norman Prixe for Best Short Film, DE
 2010 Kettupäivät Festival, Best Experimental Film
 2007 Tampere Art Film Festival, 1st Prize
 2007 Helsinki Short Film Festival, Best Experimental Film, FI

References

External links 

1981 births
Living people
21st-century Finnish women artists
Artists from Helsinki
Finnish expatriates in Germany
Finnish expatriates in the Netherlands
Finnish expatriates in Scotland
Finnish expatriates in Turkey
Finnish performance artists
Women performance artists